George Carr (born 19 January 1899, date of death unknown) was an English football player and manager. He played as a centre half for Bradford Park Avenue, Middlesbrough, Leicester City, Stockport County and as player/manager for Nuneaton Borough, he also managed Cheltenham Town from 1935 to 1937. He was born in South Bank, Middlesbrough. He was born in South Bank, Middlesbrough.

He was part of the Leicester City side that finished in the club's highest ever league finish in 1928-29 and briefly captained that side in Johnny Duncan's absence through injury. A broken leg he received in a game against Leeds United in 1925-26 was so severe, several supporters fainted on sight of it and had to be revived with salts water.

References

1899 births
Year of death missing
People from South Bank, Redcar and Cleveland
English footballers
Association football defenders
Bradford (Park Avenue) A.F.C. players
Middlesbrough F.C. players
Leicester City F.C. players
Stockport County F.C. players
Nuneaton Borough F.C. players
English Football League players
Cheltenham Town F.C. managers
English football managers